The 2023 Karachi police station attack occurred on 17 February 2023, when Islamist insurgents stormed the heavily guarded Karachi Police Office (KPO) in the heart of the provincial metropolis of Karachi, Sindh, Pakistan. The attackers used guns and grenades to kill five people - two policemen, two rangers, and a civilian - and injure 14 other people.

The Pakistani Taliban (TTP), claimed responsibility for the attack. The siege was brought to an end on the same day, with Sindh Chief Minister Murad Ali Shah later stating that the three militants responsible for the attack were killed by the police, rangers, and army.

The attack on the KPO was seen as a serious security lapse and prompted the security administration and provincial government to carry out a ‘security audit’ of government buildings and installations. The assault on the law enforcement agency's headquarters raised several questions, and a proper exercise was needed to address these concerns, including the ‘security audit’ and the plan of action the law enforcement agency was having after the terrorist attacks mainly on police across Pakistan had put demands on the security establishment in other parts of the country.

Prime Minister Shehbaz Sharif condemned the attack and emphasized that terrorists may have forgotten that Pakistan is a nation that defeated terrorism with its bravery and courage.

References

2023 in Sindh
2023 murders in Pakistan
2020s crimes in Karachi
21st-century mass murder in Pakistan
Attacks on buildings and structures in 2023
Attacks on buildings and structures in Karachi
Attacks on police stations in Asia
Attacks on police stations in the 2020s
February 2023 crimes in Asia
February 2023 events in Pakistan
Grenade attacks
Mass murder in 2023
Mass murder in Karachi
Tehrik-i-Taliban Pakistan attacks
Terrorist incidents in Karachi
Terrorist incidents in Pakistan in 2023